Zingis radiolata is a species of air-breathing land snail, a terrestrial pulmonate gastropod mollusk in the family Helicarionidae. This family is endemic to Kenya; it is threatened by habitat loss.

References 

Endemic molluscs of Kenya
Zingis
Taxonomy articles created by Polbot